The R624 road is a regional road in Ireland which runs from the south-east of the N25 in Tullagreen, County Cork to Cobh town centre. It runs to several of County Cork's tourist attractions, including Fota Wildlife Park.

An upgrade had been proposed for the R624, originally planned to begin in 2010. This upgrade expected a new section to the road, to replace the existing road from Tullagreen N25 Carrigtwohill-Cobh Interchange to Belvelly. As of late 2015, no funding for development works on the R624 had been confirmed. However in late 2015 and early 2016, a number of calls were made for funding to be allocated, in particular to fund works on the road's main bridges.

See also
Roads in Ireland
National primary road
National secondary road

References

Regional roads in the Republic of Ireland
Roads in County Cork